Matthew E. Johnson (born February 10, 1963) is a judge of the Minnesota Court of Appeals. He previously served as its Chief Judge.

Education
Johnson received his undergraduate degree from St. Olaf College in 1985 and his J.D. from William Mitchell College of Law in 1992, where he served as editor-in-chief of the William Mitchell Law Review.

Career
Following graduation, he worked as a staff auditor for the Prudential Insurance Company in Minneapolis, and then as a staff assistant to the United States Senate Committee on the Judiciary. He spent the next two years as a judicial clerk, first with Charles R. Wolle of the United States District Court for the Southern District of Iowa and then with David Hansen of the United States Court of Appeals for the Eighth Circuit.

From 1994 until 2007, Johnson was engaged in private practice in Minneapolis, most recently with Halleland Lewis Nilan & Johnson.

Judicial service
In late 2007, Governor Tim Pawlenty appointed him to a new seat on the Minnesota Court of Appeals, beginning January 1, 2008. Pawlenty later appointed him as chief judge, serving from November 1, 2010 to October 31, 2013.

References

External links
 Judge Profile: Judge Matthew E. Johnson

Living people
Lawyers from Minneapolis
St. Olaf College alumni
William Mitchell College of Law alumni
Minnesota lawyers
Minnesota Court of Appeals judges
1963 births
Politicians from Minneapolis